Muhammad Kassim Slamat (born 8 August 1997), or simply known as Kassim Slamat, is an Indonesian professional footballer who plays as a defender or midfielder for Liga 2 club Putra Delta Sidoarjo. Previously, he played for Persikabo. He is also a member of Indonesian Army.

Club career

TIRA-Persikabo
As a member of Indonesian Army, he joined the club which is owned by the Indonesian National Armed Forces, TIRA-Persikabo (now: Persikabo 1973), in 2017 to play in Liga 1. He spent his time at TIRA-Persikabo for 3 seasons.

Persiraja
The newly promoted club, Persiraja Banda Aceh, confirmed that Muhammad Kassim Slamat will play for them to compete in 2020 Liga 1. This season was suspended on 27 March 2020 due to the COVID-19 pandemic. The season was abandoned and was declared void on 20 January 2021.

PSPS Riau
In 2021, Kassim signed a contract with Indonesian Liga 2 club PSPS Riau. He made his league debut on 6 October against Semen Padang at the Gelora Sriwijaya Stadium, Palembang.

Career statistics

References

External links
 Kassim Slamat at Soccerway
 Kassim Slamat at Liga Indonesia

Indonesian footballers
1997 births
Living people
Association football defenders
Persiraja Banda Aceh players
Liga 1 (Indonesia) players
People from Ambon, Maluku